MV Kipawo is a historic Canadian passenger and freight ferry built to operate in the Bay of Fundy and which later served in Newfoundland and inspired the creation of a theater company. It was the 33rd and last ferry to provide service across Minas Passage, service which had been provided since the Acadian era.

Construction
Kipawo was launched on December 5, 1924, by the St. John Drydock & Shipbuilding Co., the first ship ever built by that yard. Kipawo was ordered for the Dominion Atlantic Railway and commissioned into service for the railway on April 1, 1926. The vessel's name is a portmanteau of the first 2 letters from three different ports on the Minas Basin: Kingsport, Parrsboro and Wolfville.

Bay of Fundy service
Kipawo provided passenger and freight service from the spring to the fall across the Minas Basin. Her sailings were scheduled to connect with Dominion Atlantic passenger trains at Wolfville and Kingsport as tides permitted. The ferry used an innovative sling system to load automobiles.

Newfoundland service

During World War II Kipawo was requisitioned by the Royal Canadian Navy and saw service in Conception Bay, Newfoundland as a tender for anti-submarine nets off the iron ore loading piers at Bell Island.

During the post-war years until retirement in 1977, Kipawo saw service as a small passenger and vehicle ferry from Bell Island to Portugal Cove, ending 51 years of service, approximately 45 of those as a ferry and currently the second-longest continuous service as a ferry in Canada (SS Prince Edward Island having operated from 1915 to 1969).

Following retirement from ferry service in Newfoundland, Kipawo saw service as a private tour boat in the waters off Terra Nova National Park for several years. While en route to St. John's one day in the late 1970s, she sought shelter in Bonavista Bay from a storm but ran aground and remained there deteriorating for several years.

Theater use
The vessel was purchased in 1981 by the Kipawo Heritage Society of Wolfville and was returned to Minas Basin in 1982. Not long after returning to the Minas Basin, Kipawo was purchased by the Town of Parrsboro, Nova Scotia for a museum and was deliberately beached in a tidal inlet immediately south of the town while funding arrangements were secured. By 1986 the museum concept was shelved in favour of housing a local theatre, the Ship's Company Theatre, which began to use the Kipawo as their performance centre. In 2004, the theatre company expanded its facilities with an expanded performance hall which architecturally incorporates the Kipawo into the outdoor lobby.

Notes

References
 Canadian Pacific's Dominion Atlantic Railway (Volume 1), Gary Ness, page 5 
 Marguerite Woodworth, History of the Dominion Atlantic Railway, page 148 
 George Musk, Canadian Pacific: Story of the Famous Shipping Line, 1981, page 260

External links
 Bell Island Net Kipawo Web Page
 Ships Company Theatre web page with pictures of Kipawo, past and present
 DAR-DPI MV Kipawo web page

Ships built in New Brunswick
Ships of CP Ships
Ferries of Nova Scotia
Ferries of Newfoundland and Labrador
Transport in Cumberland County, Nova Scotia
Transport in Kings County, Nova Scotia
1924 ships